Sceloporus esperanzae is a species of lizard in the family Phrynosomatidae. It is endemic to Honduras.

References

Sceloporus
Reptiles of Honduras
Endemic fauna of Honduras
Reptiles described in 2018